This List of Munitions of the Israeli Air Force lists the missiles, bombs and related equipment in use by the Israeli Air Force since its formation.

Air-to-air missiles

Air-to-surface missiles

AGM-12 Bullpup : Air-to-surface missile. Obsolete 
AGM-62 Walleye : Air-to-surface missile
AGM-65 Maverick : Air-to-surface missile
AGM-45 Shrike : Air-to-surface, anti-radiation missile
AGM-78 Standard : Air-to-surface, anti-radiation missile
AGM-88 HARM : Air-to-surface, anti-radiation missile
AGM-114 Hellfire : Air-to-surface, anti-tank missile
AGM-142 Popeye : Air-to-surface missile
Delilah : Air-to-surface missile
BGM-71 TOW : Air-to-surface, anti-tank missile
AGM-84 Harpoon : Air-to-surface anti-ship missile
Gabriel : Air-to-surface, anti-ship missile
 Guidance kits : GATR for Hydra 70 rockets

Bombs
GBU-12 – GBU-15 – GBU-16 – GBU-27 – GBU-28 – GBU-31 – GBU-32 – GBU-39 – BLU-109 – MPR500 – MLGB– MSOV– FASTLIGHT
 Guidance kits : JDAM – Spice

Surface-to-air missiles

 Arrow : Anti-ballistic missile system
 David's Sling : Anti-rocket & anti-cruise missiles
 MIM-104 Patriot : Surface-to-air missile
 Iron Dome : Anti-rocket & mortar defense missile

Surface-to-surface missiles
 Delilah : Surface-to-surface cruise missile
 Jericho I: 500 km range Short Range Ballistic Missile
 Jericho II: 2,800 km range Intermediate Range Ballistic Missile
 Jericho III: 5,000–11,000 km range Intercontinental Ballistic Missile

Space Systems

 Amos (1, 2, 3) – communications satellite
 EROS (A, B) – earth observation satellite
 Ofeq (3, 5, 7, 9) – reconnaissance satellite
 TecSAR – reconnaissance satellite
 Shavit 2 – space launch vehicle

See also 
Israel and weapons of mass destruction

References 

Israeli Air Force
Weapons of Israel